Măcreşti may refer to several villages in Romania:

 Măcreşti, a village in Rebricea Commune, Vaslui County
 Măcreşti, a village in Zăpodeni Commune, Vaslui County